Jaime Margaret Winstone (born 6 May 1985) is an English actress, best known for her roles in Kidulthood, Dead Set, After Hours and her portrayal of Barbara Windsor in Babs.

Early life and education
Winstone was born in Camden, North London. She is the daughter of actor Ray Winstone and his wife Elaine McCausland. She has two sisters, Lois (born 1982), who is a singer and sometime actress, and Ellie (born 2001). Jaime grew up in Enfield, North London, where she occasionally attended Enfield County School, a local state school. 

Her family later moved to Roydon, Essex where she attended Burnt Mill School in Harlow, Essex before going on to study for a BTEC National Diploma in Performing Arts at the performing arts department of Harlow College, Essex. She studied briefly at drama school, before dropping out to pursue her acting career in movies such as Anuvahood and Kidulthood.

Career 
Winstone's credits include the films Bullet Boy (2004), Daddy's Girl, Kidulthood (both 2006) and Donkey Punch (2008), the television series Murder Investigation Team, Vincent (alongside her father), Totally Frank, Goldplated and Dead Set and a short film called Love Letters. She was cast in the BBC pilot Phoo Action, but a planned series was cancelled just as filming was about to start.

Winstone sings backing vocals for her sister Lois' band. As an actress, she has appeared in the music video for The Streets' single "When You Wasn't Famous", The Twang's single "Two Lovers", and Hercules and Love Affair's single "Blind". In April 2009, she co-starred with then-boyfriend Alfie Allen in the music video for the Madness single "Dust Devil".

Winstone made her catwalk modelling debut in 2008 for Vivienne Westwood, and in February 2009 she appeared on the front cover of Arena. She made her stage debut in a Hampstead Theatre revival of The Fastest Clock in the Universe which also played at the Curve theatre, Leicester.

In March 2010, she was announced as a new patron of the East End Film Festival. Winstone stars in the Stealth Media Group-produced thriller film Manor Hunt Ball and based on the novel The Most Dangerous Game by Richard Connell.

The spring of 2010 also saw Winstone portray Anneli Alderton, one of five women murdered in Ipswich 2006, in the BBC drama Five Daughters. Alderton was the third girl to go missing in December 2006. In the summer of 2014, she filmed the lead role Lauren in Sky 1 comedy drama After Hours.

In 2013, Winstone appeared in the BBC series Mad Dogs alongside John Simm, Max Beesley, Philip Glenister and Marc Warren.

In May 2017, Winstone starred as Barbara Windsor in the BBC biopic, Babs. On preparing for the role, Winstone told The Independent: "As soon as I sat down with Barbara, I got to analyse her, to see how she moved - and I instantly related to this wonderful woman. She is so generous and easy to talk to and connect with [...] the pressure just faded away as I talked to this amazing woman. These roles don’t come along that often. It was an honour."

In January 2022, Winstone appeared on the third series of The Masked Singer as "Firework". She was sixth to be unmasked.

In September 2022, Winstone appeared in EastEnders as Peggy Mitchell in a flashback episode set in 1979.

Personal life
Winstone has been in a relationship with actor James Suckling since March 2015 and engaged to him since June 2022. They have one child together, a son born in February 2016.

Winstone was previously in a relationship, and once engaged, with actor Alfie Allen.

Filmography

References

External links 

 
 

1985 births
Living people
English film actresses
English television actresses
English women singers
21st-century English actresses
Actresses from London
Actresses from Essex
People from Camden Town
People from Enfield, London
Alumni of Harlow College
People from Roydon, Essex